Linda Riley is a British journalist, publisher and LGBTIQ+ rights advocate. She is the publisher of Diva magazine and founder of the Lesbian Visibility Week that has been observed since 2020.

Career
Riley was joint publisher of the magazines g3 and Out in the City. She later worked as an executive in the diversity and inclusion sector, and founded the Global Diversity List, European Diversity Awards, and the Pride Power List. She was a board director of GLAAD from 2013 to 2019 and has been patron of the LGBT homelessness charity Akt and the anti-bullying charity Diversity Role Models.

She became the publisher of Diva magazine in 2016. In 2020 she founded the Lesbian Visibility Week that is currently observed in multiple countries.

References

British journalists
British LGBT journalists
Living people
Year of birth missing (living people)